Ceropegia candelabrum is the type species in its genus of plants, belonging the subfamily Asclepiadoideae. The Latin specific epithet candelabrum is derived from the candelabra-like appearance of the inflorescences.

Vegetative characteristics
Ceropegia candelabrum is a perennial, succulent, twining plant with a roundish tuber. The strong, bare shoots have a diameter of 3 to 4 mm. The leaves are stalked. The slightly fleshy leaf blades are linear, elliptical to rounded tip sharpened. They are 2 to 7 cm long and 0.8 to 3.5 cm wide.

Inflorescence and flowers
The inflorescence is borne on a 1 to 3 cm long stem. The bill umbels carry 5 to 12 flowers. The flower stems are 3 to 10 mm long, the sepals about 4 mm. The corolla is 2.5 to 4.5 cm high, greenish yellow colored with red-brown stripes.

Distribution and ecology
The species is found in India and Sri Lanka as well as in Vietnam  before. In India, it blooms from August to January. Fruits are formed from September to January.

Human use and medical importance
The tuberous roots are edible and are eaten especially by the poorest, raw or cooked. The plant is also used for various medicinal purposes, so for hemorrhoids, indigestion, headaches and against bites of poisonous animals.

Ceropegia candelabrum is now in the original area has become quite rare. There are already projects for artificial propagation.

Systematics and taxonomy
The species was first described in 1753 by Carl Linnaeus. He referred to table 16 of Hortus Indicus Malabaricus published in 1689 by Henricus van Rhede. In 1795 the species was described again by William Roxburgh as Ceropegia tuberosa, making C. tuberosa a junior synonym of C. candelabrum. Ceropegia candelabrum is the type species of the genus Ceropegia L.

Japtap et al. (1999) distinguish two varieties: Ceropegia candelabrum var. candelabrum and Ceropegia candelabrum var. biflora (L.) Ansari
The varieties are not listed by the Plant List, nor the Ceropegia Checklist [8].

References

Further reading
MY Ansari: Asclepiadaceae: Genus Ceropegia. In: fascicles of Flora of India, Fascicle 16, 1984, S.1-34, Botanical Survey of India, Howrah (S.10-12)
Joseph Dalton Hooker (assisted by various botanists): The flora of British India. Volume 4. Asclepiadeae to Amarantaceae. London, Reeve & Co., 1885. Online at www.biodiversitylibrary.org (p. 70)
Herbert F. J. Huber: Revision of the genus Ceropegia. In: Memórias da Sociedade Broteriana, Volume 12, 1957, S.1-203, Coimbra (S.58-60)

AP Jagtap, N. Singh, N .: Asclepiadaceae and Periplocaceae. In: fascicles of Flora of India, Fascicle 24, 1999 S.211-241, Botanical Survey of India, Kolkata (p. 218 / 9).

Ulrich Meve: Ceropegia. In: Focke Albers, Ulrich Meve (ed.): Sukkulentenlexikon Band 3 Asclepiadaceae (milkweed family). S. 61-107, Eugen Ulmer Verlag, Stuttgart 2002, .

External links
 Vietnam Plant Data Center
 Ceropegia candelabrum on the site of Ceropegia Alexander Lang
  
 Carl Linnaeus: Species plantarum exhibentes plantas rite cognitas, ad genera relatas, cum differentiis specificis, nominibus trivialibus, synonymis Selectis, locis Natalibus, secundum systema-sexual digestas ...? Stockholm, Salvius 1753. Online at archive.org (Description S. 211)
 Henricus van Rhede tot Drakenstein: Hortus Indicus Malabaricus: continens regni Malabarici apud Indos cereberrimi onmis generis plantas rariores, Latinas, Malabaricis, Arabicis, Brachmanum charactareibus hominibusque expressas ... vol. 9, Amsterdam 1689 Online at www.biodiversitylibrary.org (p 27/8, pl. 16)
 William Roxburgh: Plants of the Coast of Coromandel; Selected From Drawings and descriptions presented to the Hon. Court of Directors of the East India Company. Vol. 1, London, Bulmer, 1795 online at Botanicus.org (Description of Ceropegia tuberosa on page 12, pl. 9).
 Rafael Govaerts (Eds.): World Checklist of Selected Plant Families (in review): Ceropegia. Published in: the plant list. A working list of all plant species. Royal Botanic Gardens Kew, Missouri Botanical Garden, Access 2 December 2011.
 Ulrich Meve: Ceropegia Checklist. A guide to alternative names used in recent Ceropegia classification. In: Dennis de Kock, Ulrich Meve:. A Checklist of Brachystelma, Ceropegia and the genera of the Stapeliads International Asclepiad Society 2007, pp 83–113.

candelabrum
Flora of the Indian subcontinent
Flora of Vietnam
Plants described in 1753
Taxa named by Carl Linnaeus